Radojica "Rado" Radojičić was a Serbian/Yugoslav football manager. He coached Rudar Pljevlja, FK Bor, the Tunisia national football team, CS Sfaxien, CA Bizertin and Océano Club de Kerkennah.

References

Living people
Croatian football managers
Yugoslav football managers
FK Rudar Pljevlja managers
FK Bor managers
Tunisia national football team managers
CS Sfaxien managers
Club Athlétique Bizertin managers
Océano Club de Kerkennah managers
Yugoslav expatriate football managers
1931 births